Bookouture is a British digital publishing company. It was founded in 2012 by Oliver Rhodes, a former marketing controller for Harlequin/Mills & Boon. Bookouture is notable for growing its e-book sales dramatically, and for having several of its publications sell substantial numbers.

Bookouture made its first big successes in 2015, when it sold 2.5 million books, including Silent Scream by Angela Marsons, a crime novel featuring detective Kim Stone, and the thriller Secrets of The Last Nazi by Iain King.  These were followed in 2016 by Robert Bryndza's The Girl in the Ice, its first book to sell a million copies.  In 2017, it was acquired by Hachette, and in 2019 it sold 9 million books more than half of them in the United States.

In 2020, Bookouture launched the imprint Thread Books, with an initial group of five non-fiction books.

Bestselling authors 

Angela Marsons
Lisa Regan
K.L. Slater
Kerry Fisher
Robert Bryndza
Kathryn Croft
Patricia Gibney
Shalini Boland
Suzanne Goldring
Jenny Hale

References 

Publishing companies established in 2012
Small press publishing companies
Publishing